Palau Reial is a station in the Barcelona Metro and Trambaix networks, in the  Les Corts district of Barcelona. It is served by metro line L3 and tram lines T1, T2 and T3. The station draws its name from the nearby minor royal palace in Pedralbes built for Alfonso XIII in 1924, part of which nowadays hosts a Museum of Decorative Arts.

The metro station is located under Avinguda Diagonal, between Carrer del Tinent Coronel Valenzuela and the biology faculty of the University of Barcelona. The tram station is located in the Avinguda Diagonal, immediately above the metro station.

The metro station opened in 1975, along with the other stations of the section of L3 between Zona Universitària and Sants Estació stations. This section was originally operated separately from L3, and known as L3b, until the two sections were joined in 1982.

See also
List of Barcelona Metro stations
List of tram stations in Barcelona

References

External links

Palau Reial at Trenscat.com

Barcelona Metro line 3 stations
Railway stations in Spain opened in 1975
Trambaix stops
Transport in Les Corts (district)